Duniyaa Jhukti Hai is a 1994 Hindi language feature film directed by Yash Chauhan and produced by S. Raghunath Rao (Raghunathrao Shirbhate). It was released on 22 December 1994. It stars Aasif Sheikh in lead role and Sadashiv Amrapurkar, Anupam Kher, Jamuna,  Rohini, etc.

Music
"Aankhon Ne Padh Li" - Udit Narayan, Kavita Krishnamurthy
"Maddona Dil Do Na" - Abhijeet
"Mein Husn Ka Saudaai" 
"Mein Sheeshadari Tu Bijlani" - Amit Kumar, Sudesh Bhosle
"Nafrat Ki Duniya Se Door" - Abhijeet, Kavita Krishnamurthy

References

1994 films
1990s Hindi-language films
Films scored by Anand–Milind